Breeden is a surname. Notable people with the surname include:

 Brick Breeden (1904–1977), American college basketball coach and player
 Carl Breeden (1891–1951), British industrialist and cricketer
 C. David Breeden (1938–2006), American sculptor
 Danny Breeden (born 1942), American former baseball player
 David Breeden (1946–2005), American clarinetist, longtime principal clarinetist of the San Francisco Symphony
 Douglas Breeden, American economics professor
 Edward L. Breeden Jr. (1905–1990), American lawyer and politician
 Elaine Breeden (born 1988), American swimmer
 Hal Breeden (1944–2021), American Major League Baseball player
 Joe Breeden, American baseball coach
 John Breeden (1872–1942), English missionary in India
 Keith Breeden (born 1956), British graphic designer and portraitist
 Leon Breeden (1921–2010), American jazz educator and clarinet player
 Louis Breeden (born 1953), American National Football League player
 M. A. Breeden (1849–1916), American politician and 2nd Attorney General of Utah
 Richard C. Breeden (born 1949), former chairman of the United States Securities and Exchange Commission
 Shirley Breeden (born 1955), American politician

See also
 Senator Breeden (disambiguation)
 Clark County School Dist. v. Breeden, one of the opinions delivered by the Supreme Court of the United States in the 2000 term 
 Breedon (disambiguation)